Sven Tage Pousette (16 August 1921 – 29 April 2012) was a Swedish diplomat.

Early life
Tage Pousette, the son of envoy Harald Pousette and his wife Cecilia (née Cedercrantz), and was born on 21 August 1921 during a stay of his father in Yokohama, Japan. He graduated as a reserve officer in 1942 and became a law graduate in Stockholm in 1948.

Career
Pousette became an attaché at the Ministry for Foreign Affairs (MFA) in 1948, served in Berlin and Bonn between 1949 and 1952, in Bern between 1952 and 1954, at the MFA between 1954 and 1957, in Paris between 1957 and 1960 and was back at the Ministry of Foreign Affairs from 1960 until 1964. Pousette was then an embassy adviser in Tehran from 1964 until 1969, in Lisbon from 1969 until 1975, and in The Hague from 1975 until 1977. He was then consul general in Minneapolis from 1978 to 1982.

Personal life
In 1953 he married Gunilla Kugelberg (1931–2017), daughter of the director Bertil Kugelberg and Märta née Forsling. They had the following children: Thérese (born 1957), Caroline (born 1959), Pauline (born 1962) and Martin (born 1967). Tage Pousette is buried in Lidingö Cemetery.

Since 1955, during the periods when he was not stationed abroad, Pousette resided in Villa Sofieberg in Hagaparken in Solna Municipality just north of Stockholm.

Awards and decorations
   Officer of the Order of Merit
   Officer of the Order of the Black Star
   Officer of the Humane Order of African Redemption
   Knight's Cross of the Order of the Falcon (27 June 1957)
  Officer of the TunRO?

References

1921 births
2012 deaths
21st-century Swedish people
20th-century Swedish people
Consuls-general of Sweden
People from Stockholm
Swedish people of Walloon descent
Tage